David Bacon may refer to:
David Bacon (actor) (1914–1943), American film actor
David Bacon (missionary) (1771–1817), American missionary and explorer who founded Tallmadge, Ohio
David Bacon (photojournalist) (born 1948), American photojournalist and author
David F. Bacon (born 1963), American computer scientist
David Francis Bacon (1813–1865), American physician and author
David William Bacon (1813–1874), bishop of Portland, Maine